Mobulu M'Futi (born 28 August 1981) is a Congolese-Swiss former professional footballer who played as a striker.

Career
M'Futi was born in Kinshasa.

He played for FC Sion from 2000 to 2002 before spending three seasons with Neuchâtel Xamax.

In 2007, after two seasons with French side FC Istres, M'Futi returned to FC Sion on a three-year contract.

On 21 February 2010, M'Futi joined FC Aarau on loan from Sion until the end of season,

References

External links
 
 
 

Living people
1981 births
Footballers from Kinshasa
Association football forwards
Democratic Republic of the Congo footballers
Democratic Republic of the Congo expatriate footballers
FC Sion players
Neuchâtel Xamax FCS players
FC Istres players
FC Aarau players
Servette FC players
FC Stade Nyonnais players
Swiss Super League players
Ligue 2 players
Expatriate footballers in France
Democratic Republic of the Congo emigrants to Switzerland
Swiss people of Democratic Republic of the Congo descent